Edward Shore (18 October 1927 – 1976) was an English footballer who played on the wing in the English Football League for Port Vale and Coventry City in the late 1940s. He later represented Hinckley Athletic.

Career
Shore joined Port Vale as an amateur in September 1945. He made his debut in a 4–0 win over Clapton Orient in a war league match at The Old Recreation Ground on 13 October 1945, and signed as a professional later in the month. After becoming a regular he lost his place in March 1946. He had played ten war league games, scoring two goals, and in the war cup scored one goal in nine appearances. As standard football continued following the end of World War II he played three matches in the Football League Third Division South. He was released by the "Valiants" at the end of the 1947–48 season by manager Gordon Hodgson. Shore moved on to Coventry City. He played two Second Division games in 1948–49 and 1949–50, before "Sky Blues" manager Harry Storer allowed him a move away from Highfield Road. He later played non-league football for Hinckley Athletic.

Career statistics
Source:

References

1927 births
1976 deaths
Sportspeople from Nuneaton
English footballers
Association football midfielders
Port Vale F.C. players
Coventry City F.C. players
Hinckley United F.C. players
English Football League players